Miljana Bojović (born in Titova Mitrovica, SFR Yugoslavia on 17 May 1987), formerly known as Miljana Musović, is a Serbian women basketball player, currently playing for Polkowice.
She has played the Eurobasket with the Serbian national team and the Euroleague with Lotos Gdynia and Good Angels Košice. She is 1.81 meters tall and plays as a point guard.

She won 4 Slovak Championships with Good Angels Kosice. She was the first foreign captain of the team and is one of the Kosice fans favourite players.

At the age 18, she was the MVP and winner of the U18 European Championship in Budapest with 17.6 points and 4.5 assists per game leaving behind names like Dominguez and Gruda. Playing for the U20 national team, she won the silver medal in the European championship averaging 16 points and 4.1 assists per game.

In recent years, she became one of the best point guards in Europe averaging over 5 assists per game in Euroleague women last 3 years. 
Miljana Bojovic is married to singer of Serbian ska band Samostalni Referenti. She is a big fan of Chelsea football club and her favorite player is John Terry.
In 2016, she signed a contract with CJM Bourges Basket  from France to replace Celine Dumerc.

Career
  Kovin (2004–05)
  Kimiko Struga (2005–06)
  Universitat-FC Barcelona (2006–07)
  Olesa (2007–08)
  Rivas Ecópolis (2008–09)
  Crvena zvezda (2009)
  Good Angels Košice (2009–10)
 Slovakia League: 2010
  Lotos Gdynia (2010)
  Good Angels Košice (2010–14)
 Slovakia League: 2011, 2012, 2013, 2014
 Slovakia Cup: 2013
  Fenerbahçe (2014–15)
 Turkish Super Cup: 2014
 Turkish Cup: 2015
  Polkowice (2015–16)
  Bourges Basket (2016–17)
 Franch Cup: 2017
  Partizan (2017–present)

References

1987 births
Living people
Sportspeople from Mitrovica, Kosovo
Serbian women's basketball players
Fenerbahçe women's basketball players
ŽKK Crvena zvezda players
ŽKK Partizan players
Point guards
Kosovo Serbs
Serbian expatriate basketball people in North Macedonia
Serbian expatriate basketball people in Spain
Serbian expatriate basketball people in Slovakia
Serbian expatriate basketball people in Poland
Serbian expatriate basketball people in Turkey
Serbian expatriate basketball people in France